Somepalli Sambaiah was an English professor and politician. He was elected to the Legislative Assembly (MLA) from Chilakaluripet constituency to the Andhra Pradesh State Assembly.

References

Andhra Pradesh MLAs 1985–1989
Andhra Pradesh MLAs 1994–1999
Year of birth missing
Year of death missing
People from Guntur district
Indian National Congress politicians from Andhra Pradesh